A nuclear gene is a gene whose physical DNA nucleotide sequence is located in the cell nucleus of a eukaryote. The term is used to distinguish nuclear genes from genes found in mitochondria or chloroplasts. The vast majority of genes in eukaryotes are nuclear.

Endosymbiotic theory 
Mitochondria and plastids evolved from free-living prokaryotes into current cytoplasmic organelles through endosymbiotic evolution. Mitochondria are thought to be necessary for eukaryotic life to exist. They are known as the cell's powerhouses because they provide the majority of the energy or ATP required by the cell. The mitochondrial genome (mtDNA) is replicated separately from the host genome. Human mtDNA codes for 13 proteins, most of which are involved in oxidative phosphorylation (OXPHOS). The nuclear genome encodes the remaining mitochondrial proteins, which are then transported into the mitochondria. The genomes of these organelles have become far smaller than those of their free-living predecessors. This is mostly due to the widespread transfer of genes from prokaryote progenitors to the nuclear genome, followed by their elimination from organelle genomes. In evolutionary timescales, the continuous entry of organelle DNA into the nucleus has provided novel nuclear genes.

Endosymbiotic organelle interactions 
Though separated from one another within the cell, nuclear genes and those of mitochondria and chloroplasts can affect each other in a number of ways. Nuclear genes play major roles in the expression of chloroplast genes and mitochondrial genes. Additionally, gene products of mitochondria can themselves affect the expression of genes within the cell nucleus. This can be done through metabolites as well as through certain peptides trans-locating from the mitochondria to the nucleus, where they can then affect gene expression.

Structure 
Eukaryotic genomes have distinct higher-order chromatin structures that are closely packaged functional relates to gene expression. Chromatin compresses the genome to fit into the cell nucleus, while still ensuring that the gene can be accessed when needed, such as during gene transcription, replication, and DNA repair.  The entirety of genome function is based on the underlying relationship between nuclear organization and the mechanisms involved in genome organization, in which there are a number of complex mechanisms and biochemical pathways which can affect the expression of individual genes within the genome. The remaining mitochondrial proteins, metabolic enzymes, DNA and RNA polymerases, ribosomal proteins, and mtDNA regulatory factors are all encoded by nuclear genes. Because nuclear genes constitute the genetic foundation of all eukaryotic organisms, anything that might change their genetic expression has a direct impact on the organism's cellular genotypes and phenotypes. The nucleus also contains a number of distinct subnuclear foci known as nuclear bodies, which are dynamically controlled structures that help numerous nuclear processes run more efficiently. Active genes, for instance, might migrate from chromosomal regions and concentrate into subnuclear foci known as transcription factories.

Protein synthesis 
The majority of proteins in a cell are the product of messenger RNA transcribed from nuclear genes, including most of the proteins of the organelles, which are produced in the cytoplasm like all nuclear gene products and then transported to the organelle. Genes in the nucleus are arranged in a linear fashion upon chromosomes, which serve as the scaffold for replication and the regulation of gene expression. As such, they are usually under strict copy-number control, and replicate a single time per cell cycle. Nuclear cells such as platelets do not possess nuclear DNA and therefore must have alternative sources for the RNA that they need to generate proteins. With the nuclear genome's 3.3 billion DNA base pairs in humans, one good example of a nuclear gene is MDH1 or the malate dehydrogenase 1 gene. In various metabolic pathways, including the citric acid cycle, MDH1 is a protein-coding gene that encodes an enzyme that catalyzes the NAD/NADH-dependent, reversible oxidation of malate to oxaloacetate. This gene codes for the cytosolic isozyme, which is involved in the malate-aspartate shuttle, which allows malate to cross past the mitochondrial membrane and be converted to oxaloacetate to perform further cellular functions. This gene among many exhibits its huge purposeful role in the entirety of an organism’s physiologic function. Although non-nuclear genes may exist in its functional nature, the role of nuclear genes in response and in coordination with non-nuclear genes is fundamental.

Significance 
Many nuclear-derived transcription factors have played a role in respiratory chain expression. These factors may have also contributed to the regulation of mitochondrial functions. Nuclear respiratory factor (NRF-1) fuses to respiratory encoding genes proteins, to the rate-limiting enzyme in biosynthesis, and to elements of replication and transcription of mitochondrial DNA, or mtDNA. The second nuclear respiratory factor (NRF-2) is necessary for the production of cytochrome c oxidase subunit IV (COXIV) and Vb (COXVb) to be maximized.

The studying of gene sequences for the purpose of speciation and determining genetic similarity is just one of the many uses of modern day genetics, and the role that both types of genes have in that process are important. Though both nuclear genes and those within endosymbiotic organelles provide the genetic makeup of an organism, there are distinct features that can be better observed when looking at one compared to the other. Mitochondrial DNA is useful in the study of speciation as it tends to be the first to evolve in the development of a new species, which is different from nuclear genes' chromosomes that can be examined and analyzed individually, each giving its own potential answer as to the speciation of a relatively recently evolved organism.

As nuclear genes are the genetic basis of all eukaryotic organisms, anything that can affect their expression therefore directly affects characteristics about that organism on a cellular level. The interactions between the genes of endosymbiotic organelles like mitochondria and chloroplasts are just a few of the many factors that can act on the nuclear genome.

References 

Genes
Molecular biology